Connor Marc Colquhoun (born 26 July 1996), known online as CDawgVA, is a Welsh YouTuber, voice actor and podcaster based in Tokyo. He is affiliated with the Kadokawa-backed agency GeeXPlus.

Career
Colquhoun created his YouTube channel CDawgVA in February 2014. Colquhoun started voice acting in parallel to his YouTube career, doing mainly amateur work with a few paying gigs. When Colquhoun lived in London, he worked professionally doing corporate narrations and commercials.

In November 2019 Colquhoun moved to Tokyo to begin working as an influencer for the Kadokawa-backed agency GeeXPlus. The effort was to help promote/introduce anime and Japanese culture to the rest of the world through his content. In February 2020, Colquhoun joined Joey Bizinger (The Anime Man) and Garnt Maneetapho (Gigguk) in creating and hosting a weekly podcast called Trash Taste, where they discuss anime, manga, otaku culture, and their experiences while living in Japan. The first episode was released on 5 June 2020, all episodes are available on YouTube, Spotify, and iTunes.

In both 2020 and 2021 Colquhoun was a presenter at the Crunchyroll Anime Awards. In August 2020, Colquhoun participated in a livestreamed chess tournament called Tournament Arc, hosted by Chess.com for anime YouTubers. In the finals, Colquhoun lost against fellow Trash Taste host Garnt Maneetapho. In July 2021's sequel championship, Tournament Arc 2, Colquhoun finished in fourth place overall.

On 29 August 2022 Colquhoun and Chris Broad participated in a  'cyclethon' across Hokkaido to raise funds for the Immune Deficiency Foundation. The cycle was streamed live on Twitch and was completed on 5 September 2022, raising over $310,000. The event was later nominated in the category of Best Philanthropic Stream Event at the 2023 Streamer Awards. On 11 December 2022, Colquhoun participated in a surprise chess-slap match with Ludwig Ahgren at the Mogul Chessboxing Championship, held at the Galen Center in Los Angeles, United States. On 1 March 2023 Colquhoun announced that he would be exclusively streaming on Twitch after signing an agreement with the livestreaming service.

Videos 
Many of Colquhoun's videos feature him cosplaying and role-playing, with roles ranging from hosts, butlers, pole dancers, and visual kei musicians. His YouTube channel gained popularity due to his anime-related content, with his favorite being JoJo's Bizarre Adventure.

Filmography 
Anime

Video games

Other voiced works

Awards and nominations

References

External links
 
 
 

1996 births
British expatriates in Japan
British podcasters
British video bloggers
Living people
People from Denbigh
Twitch (service) streamers
Welsh YouTubers
Welsh male voice actors
YouTube channels
YouTube channels launched in 2013